Rajashilpi is a 1992 Indian Malayalam-language drama film written and directed by R. Sukumaran, starring Mohanlal and Bhanupriya. The plot is a re-telling of the legend about lord Shiva and goddess Sati who was later reborn as goddess Parvati for the love of Shiva. It was Bhanupriya's first Malayalam film.

Plot

Rajashilpi is the re-telling of the legend about lord Shiva. The plot of the story is constructed in a way that the events in the legend repeats itself in a new setting with different characters but with the same spiritual auras of the main persons, especially Siva and Sati. The first image of Durga is maintained throughout the film, Durga is the re-incarnated Uma. Only after Durga comes to be aware of her re-incarnated life as Uma that she is able to fall in love with Shambu. Until then her seductive tactics go in vain. The death of Durga's father is shown very differently in the film. It is as if the Shiva is doing his Thandava, the dance of Siva out of his rage that symbolizes destruction of this universe-life of cause and effect.

Cast
 Mohanlal as Shambu
 Bhanupriya as Durga/Uma 
 Srividya as Lakshmibhai Thampuraatti	
 Nedumudi Venu as Madhavan
 Augustine as Gopalan
 T. R. Omana as Muthassi
 Captain Raju as Bhadran
 Narendra Prasad as Staanu Aashaan	
 Jagannadhan
 Santhakumari	
 Shyama

Soundtrack
The soundtrack of this movie was composed by Raveendran for which the lyrics were penned by O. N. V. Kurup.

References

External links

1992 films
1990s Malayalam-language films